"Commissions and Fees" is the twelfth and penultimate episode of the fifth season of the American television drama series Mad Men and the 64th episode of the series overall. It is co-written by Andre Jacquemetton and Maria Jacquemetton, and directed by Christopher Manley. It aired on the AMC channel in the United States on June 3, 2012.

The episode takes place in February 1967. Don (Jon Hamm) discovers that Lane (Jared Harris) stole money from the company and fires him. Sally's (Kiernan Shipka) childhood comes to an end while she has a rendezvous with former neighbor Glen Bishop (Marten Weiner). After Don expresses a yearning for more, Roger (John Slattery) gets him a meeting with Dow Chemical, a client that could shape the future of the company. When he returns home, Lane falls into a melancholic depression and later commits suicide.

The episode received critical acclaim, with particular attention given to the conclusion of Lane's story. The audience for "Commissions and Fees" rose from the previous episode and was watched by 2.41 million viewers. It was also watched by 0.8 million viewers in the age 18-49 demographic, another gain.

Plot
Lane has breakfast with a member of the American Association of Advertising Agencies, who praises his fiscal track record and asks him to serve as head of the association's fiscal control committee. He accepts. Examining the company financial records, Bert Cooper (Robert Morse) finds Lane's forged check and accuses Don of giving an unauthorized Christmas bonus, accusing Don of not acting like a grown up and leaving Don surprised and angry while promising he'll take care of the problem. Don calls Lane into his office, shows him the check and serves him a drink. Lane pretends to be ignorant at first, but then apologizes while arguing that he was only taking his own money that he had previously invested and for which he had not been compensated, lambasting Don as being out of touch with how people who aren't rich have to live. Don stuns Lane when he firmly demands his resignation and gives him the weekend to think of an "elegant exit", assuring him that this is the worst part of starting over. Lane wanders over to Joan's (Christina Hendricks) office with the drink still in his hand, but she sends him away after he makes an insinuating comment.

At a partners meeting, Pete (Vincent Kartheiser) says Jaguar would like to pay SCDP via a fee structure instead of straight commission. He adds that Jaguar's tire supplier, Dunlop, is interested in meeting with SCDP. Later declaring that he is tired of meager accounts, Don tells Roger to arrange a meeting with Ed Baxter at Dow Chemical Company. Roger calls Dow the "Moby-Dick" of accounts and reminds him that Ken Cosgrove (Aaron Staton) is hesitant about doing business with his father-in-law, but Don does not care. Over drinks, Roger tells Ken they are going after Dow Chemical but assures him he is not obligated to work on the account. Ken agrees to keep the proceedings secret from his wife if Roger agrees to force him onto the account and to exclude Pete from all meetings. Roger tells Don he arranged a meeting with Baxter on Monday.

As Betty Francis (January Jones) packs for a family ski vacation, Sally complains that she would rather spend the weekend with Don and Megan (Jessica Paré). An angry Betty calls Don to say she is dropping Sally off at his apartment. To Megan's surprise, Sally shows up at the apartment and informs her that she will be staying for the weekend. Megan later complains to Don for not telling her about Sally's visit. Don confides that he had to fire Lane for embezzlement. Lane arrives home drunk to find that Rebecca has surprised him with a new Jaguar. She tells him her reasoning — he never spends on himself. He vomits, but, the next morning, reassures Rebecca (Embeth Davidtz) that he likes the car. Lane attempts to commit suicide in the middle of the night using the new car's exhaust, but, in an ironic confirmation of Cooper's earlier retort of Jaguars that "They don't start!", the car fails to start. He then walks into SCDP's empty office and types a letter at his desk.

Sally invites Glen to visit while Don and Megan are at work the next day. He agrees. The next morning, she waits for Megan to leave the apartment before rushing to change out of her pajamas. Glen arrives at the Draper apartment. They visit the American Museum of Natural History. He admits that he told friends he was going to "do it" with her, but that he thinks of her as a little sister. Feeling ill, Sally runs to the bathroom and finds blood on her underwear. Arriving home, Megan looks for Sally and sees Glen's duffel bag. Sally takes a cab to the Francis house and sprints to the bathroom. She later hugs Betty tightly and explains that her menstrual cycle has started. Glen shows up at the Draper apartment and tells Megan that Sally left him at the museum. Betty phones and tells her that Sally "became a woman today," and just needed her mother. Megan insists Glen stay until she can drive him to his train. Betty gives Sally a hot water bottle and assures her that starting her cycle means "everything is working."

Roger rallies Don as they wait outside Baxter's (Ray Wise) office. Inside, Don puts aside Baxter's concerns about the advertised anti-smoking letter and insists Dow Chemical needs a new agency, despite having 50% of the market share. Don chides Baxter and his staff for allowing Dow to be satisfied with a 50% market share when they should go after more - and SCDP is the agency that can help them do it.

Lane's secretary drops off some company records with Joan, saying Lane has not arrived and his office door is locked. Joan tries to open Lane's door to find it blocked, and is disturbed by a foul odor and the sight of an upturned end-table. She goes into the neighbouring office, where Pete, Harry and Ken are conversing, and informs them. Pete hops up onto a couch to look into Lane's office through the partition window; he claps his hand over his mouth in shock, and Ken holds Joan as she bursts into tears. Back from their meeting with Dow, Don and Roger arrive to a nearly empty office. They soon discover Cooper, Pete and Joan seated in the break room and are informed by them that Lane hanged himself. Cooper tells them the other employees do not know yet, and were sent home on a contrived pretext. Don, Pete, and Roger force their way into Lane's office and find his corpse dangling from the door. They cut it down and place it on the couch to preserve his dignity, against the advice from the police about not tampering with a crime scene. Roger picks up a note from the floor and opens it. He tells the group that it is Lane's boilerplate resignation.

At home, Don offers to drive Glen back to his dormitory at Hotchkiss in Connecticut. Glen states that "everything you think is going to make you happy just turns to crap." Don asks what Glen would do if he could do anything; later in Don's car, Glen drives and smiles as Don helps him steer.

Production

Jared Harris was told after the tenth episode read-through by series creator Matthew Weiner that Lane Pryce's time was at an end. About Lane's forced retirement, Harris stated: "In the beginning, he doesn't know that's the reason he's being called into the office. Once it comes up, he thinks he can bluff his way out of it. And then he goes through all of these emotions, from anger to denial to depression to acceptance. It was all written in there. The [script] was very specific about the different turns he would take." Harris continued about his character's subsequent suicide: "When Matt told me [the Jaguar] idea, I laughed my ass off. When he said the car doesn't start, I just laughed for about five minutes. Nothing goes right for [Lane]...The sadness that I feel is that it's been such an amazing experience." Pete's (Vincent Kartheiser), Don's (Jon Hamm), and Roger's (John Slattery) "shocked and chaotic" reactions to Lane's corpse were the actors' genuine reactions, according to Harris.

Weiner called the decision to write off Lane Pryce "a terrible thing to have to deal with." He added, "You want to make sure that it's worth it, that they're going out with a bang and you're not sacrificing someone who's a great actor and a great musician in the orchestra. But also I feel like there have to be stakes. This year was filled with foreboding of violence and death, and the connection of that early summer between the riots, which resulted in death, police killing innocent people, and the Richard Speck murders and the guy on the Texas tower [Charles Whitman]. The randomness and the nihilism that was born from that was something that permeated the story. Lane's story I thought was about someone who has undervalued themselves and that was his only way out, he thought."

Reception

Critical reception

The episode received critical acclaim. Alan Sepinwall of HitFix wrote about the "palpable, painful sense of dread throughout this episode", stating: "Though Lane's tax trouble seemed to come out of nowhere a few weeks ago...all of his behavior, and Don's, felt very true to form, and not like characters acting in a way designed to create a specific end point. Lane was doomed, but by his own actions and foibles as much as by any plot engineering to get that noose around his neck." The Guardians Paul McInnes felt the series was "recovering its poise" on its way to the season finale, stating: "After dallying with melodrama (Pete and Beth Dawes, Harry and Hari Kinsey), the show has moved back towards the darker, more sophisticated narratives of cause and unexpected consequence. This week Lane may have taken his own life, but Don also got his mojo back and the two were directly related." Verne Gay of Newsday compared the characters of Lane Pryce and Don Draper, stating: "Both have secret lives protected by carefully constructed façades. For both, the façade is everything — and Lane's would simply fall away, like a line of dominoes when confronted with the consequences of his lie. A lie, after all, made in the service of his son."

Ratings

"Commissions and Fees" was watched by 2.41 million viewers and received an adult 18-49 rating of 0.8.

Accolades
This episode received a nomination for Outstanding Writing for a Drama Series for the 64th Primetime Emmy Awards.

Due to his nomination, Jared Harris submitted this episode for consideration for Primetime Emmy Award for Outstanding Supporting Actor in a Drama Series for the 64th Primetime Emmy Awards.

References

External links
"Commissions and Fees" at AMC

2012 American television episodes
Mad Men (season 5) episodes
Television episodes about suicide